Braian Alexis Volpini (born 16 June 1998) is an Argentine professional footballer who plays as a central midfielder for General Paz Juniors.

Career
Volpini's career with Belgrano began in 2017, when he made his debut on 22 June as a second-half substitute in an Argentine Primera División match against Newell's Old Boys. In January 2018, Volpini joined Maltese Premier League side Senglea Athletic on loan. He featured five times, prior to signing permanently in the following August. Goals followed in 2018–19 against Valletta, St. Andrews and Tarxien Rainbows as they placed eleventh. On 25 July 2019, Volpini moved to Italy with Serie B's Livorno. However, in September, Volpini would join Eccellenza Campania team Puteolana. He left in 2020.

Volpini returned to his homeland in March 2021 to sign with Torneo Regional Federal Amateur side General Paz Juniors.

Personal life
Whilst with Puteolana, Volpini ran into financial difficulties after a lack of bonuses due to the COVID-19 pandemic. His teammates Mario Follera and Paolo Sardo assisted him, while Frattese president Adamo Guarino donated him €500.

Career statistics
.

References

External links

1998 births
Living people
Footballers from Buenos Aires
Argentine footballers
Association football midfielders
Argentine expatriate footballers
Expatriate footballers in Malta
Expatriate footballers in Italy
Argentine expatriate sportspeople in Malta
Argentine expatriate sportspeople in Italy
Argentine Primera División players
Maltese Premier League players
Club Atlético Belgrano footballers
Senglea Athletic F.C. players
U.S. Livorno 1915 players
S.S.D. Puteolana 1902 Internapoli players
General Paz Juniors footballers